The vascular lacuna (Latin: lacuna vasorum) is the compartment beneath the inguinal ligament which allows for passage of the femoral vessels, lymph vessels and lymph nodes. Its boundaries are the iliopectineal arch, the inguinal ligament, the lacunar ligament, and the superior border of the pubis. The structures found in the vascular lacuna, from medial to lateral, are:

 Cloquet's node; 
 Femoral vein; 
 Femoral artery; and
 Femoral branch of the genitofemoral nerve

The vascular lacuna is separated from the muscular lacuna by the iliopectineal arch. The lacunar ligament can be a site of entrapment for femoral hernias.

References 

Muscular system